Dana Group (founded May 1, 1991) is an established group of companies in the global steel industry. It was founded by Birbal Singh Dana in 1991. It manufactures steel and automotive lubricants. The company is headquartered in UAE, and has branches, offices, and manufacturing facilities in India, Qatar, and Libya.

History
In 1991, Dr. Birbal Singh Dana shifted to Dubai and established Dana Group. Since then, Dana Group has grown to over 500 employees. In the financial year of 2004 to 2005, Dana Group had an annual turnover of 500 Million and since then there has been a substantial growth each year.

Dana Group has relationships with major steel mills around the world including Posco, Essar Steel, Hyundai Steel, Tata Steel, Libyan Iron and Steel Company, Sail, Hyundai Hysco, and Arcelor Mittal.

As of 2014, Dana Group is one of the largest international trading companies of steel, stainless steel, aluminium and other metals.

References

External links 

Emirati companies established in 1991
Manufacturing companies established in 1991
Manufacturing companies of the United Arab Emirates